Dermatobranchus albineus is a species of sea slug, a nudibranch, a marine gastropod mollusc in the family Arminidae.

Distribution
This species was described from Hottentots Huisie (Oudekraal), Atlantic coast, Cape Peninsula, Cape Province, South Africa  at 7 m depth. Multiple specimens from this locality and east as far as Algoa Bay, Port Elizabeth were included in the original description.

References

Arminidae
Gastropods described in 2011